was an award-winning Japanese writer. Internationally he is best known for his novels Shipwrecks and On Parole.

Life and work 
Yoshimura was the president of the Japanese writers' union and a PEN member. He published over 20 novels, of which On Parole and Shipwrecks are internationally known and have been translated into several languages. In 1984 he received the Yomiuri Prize for his novel Hagoku (On Parole) based on the true story of Yoshie Shiratori.

After the 2011 Tohoku earthquake and tsunami, Yoshimura's nonfiction chronicle of three previous tsunamis on the coast of Sanriku, Sanriku Kaigan Otsunami received an influx of orders, requiring a reprint of 150,000 copies. Yoshimura's wife and author in her own right, Setsuko Tsumura donated the royalties from the book to the village of Tanohata, which was heavily impacted by the tsunami. Tanohata was a favorite place of Yoshimura's to visit and inspired him to begin research on the historical tsunamis of the area.

Yoshimura was married to the writer Setsuko Tsumura.

Books (selection) 
 1966 Senkan Musashi
 English edition:. Battleship Musashi: The Making and Sinking of the Worlds Biggest Battleship. Kodansha USA, 1999 
 1967 Mizu no sōretsu
 1970 Umi no kabe sanriku kaigan ōtsunami
 1978 Tōi hi no sensō
 English edition: One Man’s Justice. Canongate 2004, 
 1979 Pōtsumasu no hata (on the 1905 Japan-Russia Treaty of Portsmouth negotiation)
 French edition: Les drapeaux de Portmouth, éditions Philippe Picquier, 1990
 1982 Hasen
 English edition: Shipwrecks (Hasen). Harvest Books 1996, 
 1983 Hagoku
 1988 Karishakuhō
 English edition: On Parole Harvest Books 2000, loosely adapted into a movie as The Eel 
 1989 Yami ni hirameku
 1998 Namamugi jiken
 1999 Amerika Hikozō (on Joseph Heco,)
 English edition: Storm Rider. Harcourt, 2004.

Awards and honors
 1966 - Dazai Osamu Prize
 1973 - Kikuchi Kan Prize
 1985 - 36th Yomiuri Prize
 1997 - Japan Art Academy member
 2006 - Order of the Rising Sun, 3rd class

References

External links 
Review of Shipwrecks  at asianreviewofbooks.com

Japanese writers
Japanese historical novelists
1927 births
2006 deaths
Gakushuin University alumni
Writers from Tokyo
Recipients of the Order of the Rising Sun, 3rd class
20th-century novelists
Yomiuri Prize winners
Presidents of the Japan Writers’ Association